Stari Ulcinj (Albanian: Ulqini i Vjetër) is a small island in the Adriatic Sea located in the south of Montenegro, in Ulcinj Municipality.

Description 
Stari Ulcinj is a small rocky island in the Ulcinj Municipality with an area of 1.8 hectares, much smaller than the other island of Ulcinj Municipality Ada Bojana. The island is about 150 meters from the coast. It has no civilian population and is used for tourism.

References

Islands of Montenegro